WWVA (1170 kHz, NewsRadio 1170) is an American AM radio station that broadcasts with studios in Wheeling, West Virginia. Its towers are located in St. Clairsville, Ohio. It is West Virginia's only class A 50,000–watt clear-channel station, sharing the frequency's Class A status with KTSB in Tulsa, Oklahoma, and KJNP in North Pole, Alaska. WWVA can be heard in most of the eastern two-thirds of the United States at night, as well as most of Canada. The station is owned by iHeartMedia, Inc. and uses the on-air nickname "The Big One" (borrowed from sister stations WLW and WTAM).

WWVA was one of the first stations in the U.S. to have an in-studio Citizens band radio to talk to listeners at night, in between songs and other on-air items, during the 1970s when it produced and ran an in-house nightly truckers' show hosted by the popular radio personality, Buddy Ray. Ray left the station in the early 1980s.

In two instances has WWVA been threatened with relocation, neither being successful: first in 1930 to Charleston by then-owner West Virginia Broadcasting Corporation, and again in 2004 to Stow, Ohio (a suburb of Akron) by then-Clear Channel Communications.

WWVA is one of the Local Primary 1 Emergency Alert System stations in the Wheeling area.

History

WWVA began broadcasting at 2 a.m. on December 13, 1926 when John Stroebel threw the switch that sent power to a home-built 50-watt transmitter in the basement of his home. One week earlier, the Federal Radio Commission had granted a broadcast license on 860 kHz to the radio station WWVA. In its first year of operation, it broadcast to listeners with home-made crystal sets, principally from Stroebel's own home.  The call letters are derived from the words Wheeling, West Virginia (WWVA) as U.S. postal codes were once written out with three letters such as WVA for West Virginia, hence Wheeling, WVA became "WWVA."

Through the years, WWVA has been granted several power increases. In May 1941, the FCC moved WWVA to 1170, and in August of that same year, granted it the highest power for AM stations: 50,000 watts. With the increase, WWVA became the most powerful AM station in the entire state of West Virginia.

WWVA has changed hands many times over the years. Past owners include Fidelity Investments, West Virginia Broadcasting Corporation, Storer Broadcasting, Basic Communications, Screen Gems Radio - a division of Columbia Pictures, Coca-Cola, Price Broadcasting, Osborn Communications, Atlantic Star Communications, AMFM Inc., and Clear Channel Communications. It is currently owned by iHeartMedia.

WWVA’s broadcast history includes the airing of such notable live broadcasts as President Dwight D. Eisenhower’s 1952 visit to the Wheeling area.  In the 1980s, WWVA briefly enjoyed a reputation as one of the leading radio news operations in the country, and won several national news reporting awards under the leadership of prominent broadcast journalists such as Jim Forsyth and Colleen Marshall, but that reputation faded in the 1990s. Harvey, however, remained on the station's schedule, as did the legendary Jamboree USA and Jamboree in the Hills broadcasts. The WWVA Jamboree broadcasts started on January 7, 1933, and were even transmitted to troops abroad during World War II.

Under Basic Communications ownership, the Jamboree became the centerpiece of an all-contemporary country western format starting on November 8, 1965, a format that saw ratings skyrocket weeks after it debuted. "This is WWVA, the big country" was their signature. In 1970 the studios and the Jamboree moved to the Capitol Music Hall, a civic center that is the largest in West Virginia.

This country music format lasted until 1997 when WWVA abandoned it in favor of news/talk. Assumption of ownership by Clear Channel Communications resulted in the addition of such hosts as Rush Limbaugh and Glenn Beck. A series of cost-cutting moves in January 2004 resulted in the elimination of both local talk hosts (George Kellas and Jim Harrington) and most of the news department. Coinciding with this was an attempt to relocate the station to Stow, Ohio, under an FCC major construction permit four weeks later. This application was withdrawn in August 2004.

Since then, much of WWVA's programming emulates regional sister station WHLO in Akron, Ohio. One local link to the station's past was the afternoon drive show hosted by former sportscaster Steve Novotney, but he was also fired from WWVA in November 2006. At the time, the only local talk show remaining on WWVA was Saturday Sports Day with John Simonson, but WWVA, then in negotiations with new ownership, made a bold move when they paid more money to David Bloomquist to export his Bloomdaddy Experience from rival local station, WKKX in late May/early June 2007. The move was controversial (even though the reason given by WKKX to let Bloomquist go was in connection with the Don Imus Rutgers controversy that transpired on MSNBC around that same time), as WKKX members appeared bitter about the exit. Clear Channel began to syndicate Bloomdaddy through the northeast and midwest after the cancellation of The War Room with Quinn and Rose in November 2013.

The Original Wheeling Radio Jamboree (formerly Jamboree USA) is the second-longest running program in radio history (The Grand Ole Opry on WSM Nashville is the oldest, having first aired in 1925). However, the Jamboree was dropped from WWVA's schedule in December 2008, and went to WKKX for a time. In 2015 it was picked up by community station WWOV-LP/101.1.

On August 4, 2010, a severe thunderstorm, classified as a "down burst" by the National Weather Service, pushed through the Wheeling area knocking the 3–tower array, located in nearby St. Clairsville, Ohio, to the ground. The station was knocked completely off the air and took its programming to sister station WBBD on August 5.
On August 5, 2010 at 10:30 pm, transmissions on 1170 AM were restored using temporary equipment.

On November 16, 2006, WWVA, WOVK, WVKF, WKWK, WEGW and WBBD were announced for sale as part of Clear Channel's divestiture of almost 450 small and middle-market radio properties in the U.S. The Clear Channel Wheeling stations were initially slated to be sold to Florida-based GoodRadio.TV LLC in May 2007, but the deal soon collapsed prior to FCC approval.

Prior to 2009, unlike most Clear Channel news talk stations, WWVA did not air the overnight network program Coast to Coast AM. Instead, it aired America's Trucking Network – still listed as The Truckin' Bozo on the schedule, even several years after the show's name change. The trucking show had been a longtime staple of WWVA's nighttime schedule. WWVA was one of the first and last stations to syndicate The Truckin' Bozo, and even before that, Buddy Ray hosted a longtime truck show on the station. The trucking programming was unceremoniously dropped in 2009, replaced with Coast to Coast AM, already available from the many other AM signals that penetrate the area.

Programming
Ron Podesta hosts the morning-drive program; this show is also regionally syndicated to talk stations in Ohio and WV. The Glenn Beck Program, The Sean Hannity Show and The Buck Sexton Show air in late-mornings, middays, afternoons and early evenings, respectively. WWVA airs paid religious programming in the late evenings and Coast to Coast AM in the overnight hours. This Morning, America's First News with Gordon Deal is also carried in the early morning hours.

WWVA produces Extension Calling, a local agricultural education program recorded by Ohio State University and West Virginia University extension agents, aired Sunday mornings for over 40 years.

Its signal can be picked up quite strongly as far away as Toronto, Ontario, Canada, giving Toronto the ability to hear programs which are not permitted to air locally due to Canadian content regulations.

References

External links
 FCC History Cards for WWVA

In-house history of WWVA published on the station's 50th anniversary
Arcane Radio Trivia - The Newcomer twins of WWVA
Pictures of WWVA's Towers Down
map of WWVA-AM (Wikimapia)

WVA (AM)
Radio stations established in 1926
IHeartMedia radio stations
News and talk radio stations in the United States
1926 establishments in West Virginia
Clear-channel radio stations